Isaac Chansa (born 23 March 1984), popularly known as "Zife", is a Zambian professional footballer who plays as a midfielder for Forest Rangers in the Zambia Super League.

Club career

Chambishi and Power Dynamos
Chansa was born in Kitwe and began his professional club career at Chambishi, but he didn’t find his place in the first squad and later moved to Power Dynamos. With Dynamos, he appeared in 45 league matches, scoring 16 goals between 2002 and 2004. He was in Dynamos' 2003 Zambian Cup, 2003 Zambian Coca-Cola Cup and 2004 Zambian Charity Shield winning squad. He has also appeared in 2002 African Cup Winners' Cup.

Orlando Pirates
From 2004 to 2007, he moved to South Africa and played for Premier Soccer League side Orlando Pirates, where he scored 7 goals in 43 league matches. He was in Pirates' Premier Soccer League 2004–05 and 2005–06 Runners-up squad. With Pirates, he won the friendly tournament Vodacom Challenge in 2005.

In 2020, then Orlando manager Milutin Sredojevic, has identified Chansa as one of the best players he has ever coached, thanks to the player's big heart and true discipline.

Helsingborgs
He later joined Swedish Superettan team Helsingborgs IF for the 2007–08 season to team up with former South Africa national team coach Stuart Baxter. Chansa played there until 2009. In late 2006, while still playing for Pirates, Chansa was banned by the PSL for three months (nine suspended) after he was found guilty of assaulting an assistant referee during Pirates’ clash against Jomo Cosmos.

With Helsingborgs IF, he appeared in UEFA Cup matches in 2007 and UEFA Europa League qualifying matches in 2009.

Second stint with Orlando
After the end of his contract in Sweden with Helsingborgs IF, he returned on 1 February 2010 to his former club Orlando Pirates. He signed a pre-contract with Pirates' Soweto rivals Kaizer Chiefs to join the club in July 2012. He played for the team, where he had already used to play earlier, a season and a half and featured in 41 matches, where he scored 12 goals. 

He also won the Premier Soccer League title in 2010 with Orlando and he is still considered as Pirates legend.

Henan Jianye
In June 2012, Orlando Pirates confirmed that he moved to Chinese club Henan Jianye F.C. for a transfer fee of 700,000 US Dollars.

Chansa, who scored a spectacular goal against Golden Arrows at Orlando Stadium to wrap up Pirates' league title on the final day of the season two years ago, joined the Henan Jianye, which is based in Zhengzhou in the province of Henan. The club was promoted to the Chinese Super League in 2006. They finished third in 2009. Chansa joined Zambia teammate and former Jomo Cosmos star Chris Katongo at Henan.

It was not a suitable move for him and after an even more chaotic and the unsatisfying season of Chinese Super League in 2012, the club was relegated to the second division and he came back to Zambia.

Zanaco F.C.
In 2013, after the end of the Chinese Super League season, Chansa became a free agent after his Chinese club Henan Jianye offloaded him. He then came back to Zambia and hired by Zanaco until he get a new club. It was announced that, Chansa has joined FAZ/MTN Super league defending champions Zanaco as a guest player. He scored 5 goals in 25 Zambia Super League matches from 2013 to 2014.

Shillong Lajong
On 8 August 2014, it was confirmed that, Indian I-League club Shillong Lajong FC have completed the signing of Zambian International and African Cup of Nations 2012 winner Isaac Chansa as their 3rd foreigner.

On his new contract, Chansa said that "I am happy and look forward to this new challenge. I will do my best to contribute in the team’s success in any way I can and repay the faith shown in me by the team management."

He played only few 2014–15 Indian Federation Cup matches for Lajong and have not appeared in any I-League match.

NorthEast United
After signing a short term contract with Shillong Lajong, he loaned out to their affiliated Indian Super League side NorthEast United FC in 2014. 

He made his Indian Super League debut on 16 October against giants Atlético de Kolkata in a 2-0 loss match. With the NorthEast, he appeared in 8 league matches.

Mitra Kukar
In 2015, he moved to Liga 2 (Indonesia) outfit PS Mitra Kukar and appeared in few league matches but lifted the General Sudirman Cup in 2015.

Back to Zanaco
He returned to Zambia and signed with his previous club Zanaco F.C. for 2 seasons. He played there until 2017 and won the 2016 Zambian Super League.

Royal Eagles
Chansa after his stint with Zambian champions Zanaco FC, returned to South Africa to reunite with Royal Eagles F.C. coach Kosta Papic. The Serbian manager was at the helm at Pirates during Chansa’s first stint with "the Bucaneers" from 2004 to 2007. 

"Chansa is already training with the club and has signed but is waiting the issuing of his work permit", Papic told to kickoff.com on 8 March 2017. Eagles were chasing promotion this season and feel the experience of the Zambian midfielder helped them with that target.

International career
Chansa made gis senior international debut for Zambia on 1 May 2004 against Zimbabwe in a 1-1 draw match, where he scored a goal. Chansa was part of the Zambian 2006 African Nations Cup team, which finished third in group C in the first round of competition, thus failing to secure qualification for the quarter-finals. Then he also represented his country in numerous FIFA World Cup qualification matches alongside the main rounds of later African Nations Cup.

Chansa's biggest achievement is winning the African Cup of Nations for his country in February 2012, defeating Ivory Coast. He was also part of the 2014 Zambian national team that took on Japan in the Pre-World Cup International Friendly in the USA.

Between 2004 and 2016, he earned 69 international caps, representing Zambia and scoring 3 goals.

Career statistics

International goals
Scores and results list Zambia's goal tally first.

Honours

Country
Zambia
Africa Cup of Nations
 Champions (1): 2012

Club
Orlando Pirates
MTN 8 Cup
 Champions (1): 2010
Premier Soccer League
 Champions (2): 2010–11, 2011–12
Nedbank Cup
 Champions (1): 2011–12
Zanaco
Zambia Super League
 Champions (1): 2016

See also
 Zambia international footballers

References

External links 
 
 Isaac Chansa transfers at aiscore.com

1984 births
Living people
People from Kitwe
Zambian footballers
Zambian expatriate footballers
Zambia international footballers
2006 Africa Cup of Nations players
2008 Africa Cup of Nations players
2010 Africa Cup of Nations players
2012 Africa Cup of Nations players
Zambian expatriate sportspeople in Sweden
Zambian expatriate sportspeople in South Africa
Zambian expatriate sportspeople in China
Expatriate footballers in Sweden
Expatriate soccer players in South Africa
Expatriate footballers in China
Expatriate footballers in India
Expatriate footballers in Iraq
I-League players
Indian Super League players
Helsingborgs IF players
Association football midfielders
Orlando Pirates F.C. players
Allsvenskan players
Henan Songshan Longmen F.C. players
2013 Africa Cup of Nations players
Zanaco F.C. players
Shillong Lajong FC players
NorthEast United FC players
Chinese Super League players
Africa Cup of Nations-winning players
Forest Rangers F.C. players
Zambia A' international footballers
2016 African Nations Championship players